The Phillip Island Trophy was a new addition to the WTA Tour in 2021.

Daria Kasatkina won the title, defeating Marie Bouzková in the final, 4–6, 6–2, 6–2.

Seeds
The top eight seeds received a bye into the second round.

  Sofia Kenin (second round)
  Bianca Andreescu (semifinals)
  Johanna Konta (withdrew)
  Petra Martić (quarterfinals)
  Wang Qiang (third round)
  Zhang Shuai (withdrew)
  Anastasia Pavlyuchenkova (third round)
  Danielle Collins (semifinals)

  Sloane Stephens (first round)
  Caroline Garcia (first round)
  Zheng Saisai (first round)
  Nadia Podoroska (first round)
  Marie Bouzková (final)
  Anastasija Sevastova (first round)
  Alizé Cornet (first round)
  Rebecca Peterson (quarterfinals)

Draw

Finals

Top half

Section 1

Section 2

Bottom half

Section 3

Section 4

Qualifying

Seeds

Qualifiers

Lucky losers

Draw

First qualifier

Second qualifier

Third qualifier

Fourth qualifier

Fifth qualifier

Sixth qualifier

Seventh qualifier

Eighth qualifier

References

External links
 Main draw
 Qualifying draw

2021 WTA Tour
2021 Singles